Cassago Brianza is a comune (municipality) in the Province of Lecco in the Italian region Lombardy, located about  northeast of Milan and about  southwest of Lecco.  Part of the Brianza traditional region, it was formed in 1927 by the merger of the previous comuni of Cassago and Oriano Brianza.

Cassago Brianza borders the following municipalities: Barzanò, Bulciago, Cremella, Monticello Brianza, Nibionno, Renate, Veduggio con Colzano.

It is considered the place ("Rus Cassiciacum") where Saint Augustine spent the fall and winter before he was baptised.

References

External links
 Official website

Cities and towns in Lombardy